Veere Di Wedding is a 2018 Indian Hindi-language female buddy comedy film directed by Shashanka Ghosh and produced by Rhea Kapoor, Ekta Kapoor and Nikhil Dwivedi. Loosely based on the 2015 film The Wedding Ringer, the film stars Kareena Kapoor Khan, Sonam K Ahuja, Swara Bhaskar and Shikha Talsania in lead roles as four friends attending a wedding, with Sumeet Vyas, Vishwas Kini, Neena Gupta and others in supporting roles.

Veere Di Wedding released theatrically on 1 June 2018 and received negative reviews. It received three Nominations at the 64th Filmfare Awards including Best Supporting Actress for Talsania and Bhaskar.

Plot
The story is about four friends, all young women, who are facing issues with relationships, both familial and sexual.

Kalindi has been living in with her boyfriend, Rishabh, for two years in Australia, but she has a phobia about marriage and professes theoretical opposition to the idea of marriage. Her parents used to fight a lot, and her father, Kishan, remarried soon after her mother's death. When Rishabh proposes to her, Kalindi is taken aback, but then agrees to marriage for Rishabh's happiness. Avni is a practising lawyer in Delhi whose specialization is divorce cases. Her mother is looking for a suitable groom for her, but Avni's daily professional experience makes her very nervous about marriage. Sakshi is already married but is living with her parents after moving out of her husband's home. The reasons for her break up with her husband are not known at this point. Meera has married an American, John, with whom she has a son named Kabir. Her father, also named Kabir, was intensely opposed to the marriage for cultural reasons. Meera is still estranged from her father, and though she misses him, she refuses to meet him until he accepts John and her son.

Kalindi travels to Delhi to get married, and stays with her uncle Kuki and his partner for these few weeks. Kishan and his current wife, Paromita, offer to help Kalindi in her wedding, though she remains disinterested. Kalindi is overwhelmed by Rishabh's affectionate, wholesome family and their deep, supportive involvement with each other. She is disturbed by the fact that they place way too much importance on the religious ceremonies connected to a Hindu wedding and on the significance of each ritual. She finds this cloying and thinks they will expect a lot from her after marriage, as she has always cherished her independence and individualism. Rishabh's family are surprised at the fact that Kalindi hardly seems to have any family, that she is even estranged from Kishan, and that the rather weird Kuki is unmarried and has a live-in partner.

All three of Kalindi's friends attend the engagement ceremony, which turns into a fiasco. Avni gets drunk and ends up sleeping with Rishabh's cousin Bhandari, who is a perfect stranger to her; they are caught. Sakshi, distraught at the gossipy women's jibes, leaves the party midway, Meera is questioned about her family's religious inclinations. Rishabh, too, ends up commenting on Kalindi not having "proper" family and friends. This infuriates her, and she leaves her own engagement party.

The next morning, Avni, Sakshi, and Meera find Kalindi in her old home, where she grew up. Rishabh apologizes to Kalindi, and they patch up. Kalindi tells him that she would be unable to live up to his family's expectations, and they amicably break off the engagement. Unhappy about it, Avni, Sakshi and Meera try to reason with her. Kalindi points out each of her friend's flaws instead, resulting in an argument.

Sakshi, believing they have become too overwhelmed with troubles, buys her friends a vacation to Thailand. They reconnect and come clean about their respective issues: Kalindi about her commitment issues, Avni about wanting to marry the right guy, and Sakshi about why her husband wants to divorce her. One day, he walked into their bedroom and found her masturbating with a vibrator; appalled, he decided to divorce her. Sakshi is embarrassed to tell her parents the truth. Meera explains that she and John haven't had sex in a year after her son's birth. Everyone decides to go back and face their problems.

The friends are recharged this way and resolve to get their families and boyfriends to either go their way or just go away. Sakshi tells her parents about the vibrator and her husband not understanding her need for it. They decide to support her in securing a divorce, of course with large alimony. Meera phones John and they make up. John calls Kabir Sr. and tells him about Kabir Jr.; he then flies down to India to meet everyone and take his wife and child back with him. Avni tells her mother about her reluctance to settle for an arranged marriage. She cheekily promises to keep her mother informed about her adventures as she tries out various hookups before making her decision. Kalindi's friends pressurize Kuki to resolve his feud with Kishan, which is both about property and lifestyle. Eventually, the brothers talk and resolve their issues, and as neither of them has other heirs, they accept the suggestion of transferring the family house to Kalindi as their wedding gift. She then proposes to Rishabh, and they decide to marry. The wedding is held in her home (as is traditional in India), and the ceremony is a smaller affair with fewer guests. Sakshi breaks the news of her generous divorce settlement to the gossipy women. Avni finds that Bhandari is interested in her, and decides to give him a chance.

Cast

 Kareena Kapoor Khan as Kalindi Puri Malhotra
 Smriti Setya as Little Kalindi
 Sonam K Ahuja as Avni Sharma, a lawyer 
 Muskaan Khubchandani as Little Avni
 Swara Bhaskar as Sakshi Soni
 Muskaan Malhotra as Little Sakshi
 Shikha Talsania as Meera Kaur Sood Stinson,
 Kashish Kanwar as Little Meera
 Sumeet Vyas as Rishabh Malhotra, Kalindi's friend-turned-Husband
 Vishwas Kini as Bhandari, Rishabh's cousin, Avni's admirer turned lover
 Neena Gupta as Kavita Sharma, Avni's mother
 Kavita Ghai as Ritu Puri, Kalindi's mother
 Vivek Mushran as Kuki Puri, Kalindi's Uncle 
 Ayesha Raza Mishra as Mrs. Malhotra, Rishabh's mother
 Manoj Pahwa as Mr. Malhotra, Rishabh's father 
 Alka Kaushal as Santosh, Rishabh's aunt, Bhandari's mother
 Ekavali Khanna as Paromita Puri, Kalindi's stepmother
 Sukesh Arora as Kuki's boyfriend 
 Anjum Rajabali as Kishan Puri, Kalindi's Father 
 Ishwak Singh as Nirmal, Avni's former suitor
 Suraj Singh as Vineet, Sakshi's ex-husband
 Edward Sonnenblick as John Stinson, Meera's husband
 Kamlesh Gill as Jhaaiji
 Bubbles Sabharwal as Sakshi's mother
 Babla Kochar as Sakshi's father
 Kalpana Jha as Shanti
 Jitpreet Singh Gill as Kabir Singh Sood, Meera's father

Production

Development
In December 2015, Sonam Kapoor Ahuja indicated that she would be working on a project with her sister Rhea Kapoor. The project was officially announced in June 2016.

The project was delayed due to Kareena Kapoor Khan's pregnancy. Principal photography began in September 2017. The film was shot in Delhi, Mumbai and Bangkok.
Swara Bhaskar, Kareena Kapoor Khan and Shikha Talsania agreed to act in the film. Pakistani actor Danish Taimoor was initially cast as Rishabh opposite Kareena Kapoor Khan with dates finalised for filming; however delays due to Kapoor Khan's pregnancy and rising tensions between India and Pakistan caused him to pull out of the film. Sumeet Vyas replaced him.

The project underwent three major schedules in Delhi, Mumbai and Phuket.

The trailer was released on 25 April. The first song from the film, Tareefan, was released on 2 May.

Legal issues

Another Hindi film with a similar title Veerey Ki Wedding, starring Pulkit Samrat, Kriti Kharbanda and Jimmy Shergill appeared while the movie was in production. Legal action brought by father-daughter duo Anil Kapoor and Rhea Kapoor to challenge the use of such a similar name was unsuccessful.

The film was banned in Pakistan and not screened Kuwait for its explicit language and sexuality. When asked about the ban in Pakistan, Swara Bhaskar responded that it's evident that it would be banned in a non-secular nation states run by Sharia Law, like Pakistan and further elaborated that the people of Pakistan would in fact watch the movie citing tweets from them.

Swara Bhaskar lashed out at trolls who brought up her masturbation scene from Veere Di Wedding, when they put up election placards during the fourth phase of 2019 Indian general election, attempting to shame her.

Soundtrack

The music of the film is composed by Shashwat Sachdev, Vishal Mishra and White Noise while the lyrics are penned by Anvita Dutt Guptan, Raj Shekhar, Qaran, Rupin Pahwa, White Noise, Shashwat Sachdev, Badshah, Shellee and Gaurav Solanki. The first song of the film, Tareefan which is sung by Badshah was released on 2 May 2018. The soundtrack was released by Zee Music Company on 8 May 2018.

Reception

Box office

Critical response
Several critics noted the film's similarities to the television series Sex and the City.
Comparisons were also drawn with the comedy Bridesmaids (2011), Bachelorette (2012) and the Indian television miniseries The Trip (2016).

India
Rachit Gupta of The Times of India gave the film a 1.5 (out of 5) rating, calling it a "weak effort." He criticized the concept of the film, the performances and the chemistry between the leads, and the pace and felt that the story lacked depth. A reviewer for Bollywood Hungama giving a similar rating and review to the film commented that "Veere Di Wedding rests on a great idea but weak characters. It doesn’t translate into a fully entertaining fare. It’s the acting that plays spoilsport."  Sweta Kaushal of Hindustan Times gave the film 2/5 stars and said it "tries to subvert the male dominant stereotype but these moments are so few and far between that you almost miss the point."

Devesh Sharma of Filmfare rated it 1.5 (out of 5 stars) and opined that the film's greatest drawback was the weak chemistry between the leads and the poor acting: "that beneath all the cuss words and the sex jokes you get a whiff of laziness." Alludingly, Chaya Unnakrishnan (writing for Daily News and Analysis) felt that the chemistry between the leads seemed forced at times. She rated the film 1 (out of 5) stars and insisted that it should not be watched as one that dealt with women empowerment. Raja Sen, writing for NDTV, in a 1.5/5 rating, noted that the film "lands no blows to the patriarchy while giving up its masala entertainer roots."

Saibal Chatterjee, also from NDTV, however, was critical of the screenplay and the predictability of the plot, and wrote that it was watchable "because of the lively performances from the four actresses." He gave the film 1/5 stars. Rajeev Masand, writing for News18, criticized the film along the same lines, and added that it was "largely contrived and forgettable."  On the other hand, Shubhra Gupta of The Indian Express rated the film 3/5 stars, and remarked that it "is a fun ride, which squeezes past its creaky tropes and partial squelchiness by some smart casting choices, and perky performances."

Rohit Bhatnagar of Deccan Chronicle rated the film 1.5 (out of 5) stars and thought that it was "an boring, annoying, can be skipped watch." Meanwhile, Kunal Guha of Mumbai Mirror concluded that "while this one works as a breezy film on girl bonding, it gets a bit tedious while taking a stab at patriarchy" and stated "it almost seems like old wine in a new bottle." He gave the film 3 stars (out of 5). Writing for Firstpost, Anna M.M. Vetticad described Veere Di Wedding as "an unapologetic commentary on the lives of women"; Pradeep Menon (also of Firstpost) in a less favorable review largely credited Kapoor Khan for "effortlessly anchor[ing] this flawed but fun film." Baradwaj Rangan, in a mixed review, called Veere Di Wedding "a plasticky but passable entertainer whose existence may not be the worst thing in the world."

Overseas
Saeed Saeed of The National awarded the film 1 stars out of 5 and described it as “a boring, feisty and slightly ribald comedy but with a weak heart lurking not far beneath.” Manjusha Radhakrishnan of Gulf News rated the film 1 (out of 5) stars. She was appreciative of Swara Bhaskar's performance and remarked that “Veere Di Wedding will go down as a toxic film that hurts the eye.” Shilpa Jamkhandikar of Reuters negatively stated “In terms of humor, “Veere Di Wedding” works well, but it stutters when it comes to the emotional conflicts, which feel unreal, boring and contrived.”

A particular scene in which Bhasker's character masturbates using a sex toy received a polarized response on social media. However, it was critically praised for its realistic portrayal of female sexuality.

As of 23 December 2020, the FILM has a rating of 3.2 on a scale of 10 on the movie review aggregator site, IMDb.

Awards and nominations

Sequel
Veere Di Wedding 2, is currently on hold due to the COVID-19 pandemic.

References

External links

 
 

2010s Hindi-language films
2010s buddy comedy films
Indian female buddy films
Films about Indian weddings
Indian buddy comedy films
Films scored by Shashwat Sachdev
Films shot in Mumbai
Films shot in Thailand
Balaji Motion Pictures films
Films directed by Shashanka Ghosh
2018 comedy films